The 2018–19 CSA Provincial One-Day Challenge was a List A cricket competition that took place in South Africa from 7 October 2018 to 7 April 2019. The tournament was played in parallel with the 2018–19 CSA 3-Day Provincial Cup, a first-class competition which featured the same teams. North West were the defending champions.

The competition was played between the thirteen South African provincial teams. In previous editions of the competition, Namibia had also competed. However, in October 2018 they withdrew from South Africa's provincial competitions, citing issues around costs and logistics.

Easterns won Pool A and Northerns won Pool B to advance to the final, with Easterns appearing in their first one-day final in 16 years. Easterns won the tournament, after they beat Northerns by two wickets in the final.

Points table

Pool A

 Team qualified for the final

Pool B

 Team qualified for the final

Fixtures

October 2018

November 2018

December 2018

January 2019

February 2019

March 2019

Final

References

External links
 Series home at ESPN Cricinfo

South African domestic cricket competitions
CSA Provincial One-Day Challenge
2018–19 South African cricket season